Chongo Ezra Mulenga (born 19 August 1998) is a Zambian male badminton player. In 2013, he won the men's singles title at the Ethiopia International tournament. In 2014, he placed third at the Uganda International in the mixed doubles event partnered with Ogar Siamupangila. Mulenga represented his country at the 2014 and 2018 Commonwealth Games.

Achievements

BWF International Challenge/Series
Men's singles

 BWF International Challenge tournament
 BWF International Series tournament
 BWF Future Series tournament

References

External links
 

1998 births
Living people
People from Ndola
Zambian male badminton players
Badminton players at the 2014 Commonwealth Games
Badminton players at the 2018 Commonwealth Games
Badminton players at the 2022 Commonwealth Games
Commonwealth Games competitors for Zambia
Competitors at the 2019 African Games
African Games competitors for Zambia